Tuditanus is an extinct genus of tuditanid microsaur from the Carboniferous, ~ 306 Ma ago. It was of small size, reaching a length of about 24 cm.

See also
 Prehistoric amphibian
 List of prehistoric amphibians

References

Microsauria
Carboniferous amphibians